Eurybia franciscana is a butterfly of the family Riodinidae. It is found in Central and most of South America, including Peru, Suriname, and Ecuador.

The wingspan is 45–47 mm.

References

Butterflies described in 1862
Riodininae
Riodinidae of South America
Taxa named by Baron Cajetan von Felder
Taxa named by Rudolf Felder